The Communications Authority is a statutory body responsible for licensing and regulating the broadcasting and telecommunications industries in Hong Kong. It was formed in 2012 through a merger of the Hong Kong Broadcasting Authority, Television and Entertainment Licensing Authority, and the Telecommunications Authority. The organisation is authorized to investigate complaints made regarding programmes, issue warnings and fines, or even suspend the license of the radio or television station.

The authority enforces the Broadcasting Ordinance (Cap. 562), the Telecommunications Ordinance (Cap. 106), the Unsolicited Electronic Messages Ordinance (Cap. 593), Communications Authority Ordinance, and the Broadcasting (Miscellaneous Provisions) Ordinance (Cap. 391).

The regulatory agency is ostensibly independent of the government, but its executive functions are supported by the Office of the Communications Authority (OFCA), a government department with a self-funding trust structure. In 2020, the Communications Authority issued a statement against RTHK concerning a comedy show for purportedly "denigrating and insulting" the Hong Kong Police Force.

In 2023, the agency recommended to the Chief Executive that free-to-air broadcasters transmit 30 minutes of patriotic and national security programming every week; the Chief Executive, John Lee, accepted the idea and made it mandatory.

Structure

The CA is headed by a chair and 11 other members:

The current Board of the CA  consist of:
 Winnie TAM Wan-chi, SC - Chair
 Eliza LEE Man-ching, JP  - Vice-Chair
 Karen CHAN Ka-yin, JP
 Stephen HUNG Wan-shun
 Yvonne LAW SHING Mo-han, BBS, JP	
 Thomas LO Sui-sing, JP	
 Hubert NG Ching-wah	
 Anthony William SEETO Yiu-wai	
 Benjamin TANG Kwok-bun, GBS	
 XU Yan
 Ray YEP Kin-man
 Agnes WONG Tin-yu, JP

List of Chairman

 Ambrose Ho 2012–2017: former Chairman of the Broadcasting Authority 2008-2012
 Mr Huen Wong, BBS, JP 2017-?
 Ms Winnie TAM Wan-chi, SC ?-present

Comparisons
Similar bodies around the world are:
Australia: Australian Communications and Media Authority
Canada: Canadian Radio-television and Telecommunications Commission (CRTC)
France: Regulatory Authority for Audiovisual and Digital Communication (formerly Superior Audiovisual Council and earlier ORTF)
United Kingdom: Office of Communications (Ofcom)
United States: Federal Communications Commission (FCC)

References

External links
 

2012 establishments in Hong Kong
Commucations Authority
Hong Kong government departments and agencies
Communications and media organizations